Giovanni (Michele) Barbavara (died 1460) was a Roman Catholic prelate, and member of a noble Novara family. He was closely related to Francesco Barbavara who was the chancellor to the Duke of Milan, Gian Galeazzo Visconti. He was the brother of Marcolino Barbavara, who was the Milanese ambassador to Rome, Francesco Barbavara II and Pietro Barbavara, apostolic protonotary. Another close relative was Antonio Barbavara the Abbot of the Abbey of Saints Nazario and Celso. In the village of Villareale, east of Cassolnovo, where his family had a castle, there is a road named after him. He reportedly attended the Papal Council of Basel. He was a teacher in the University of Pavia from (1429-1434) and later he served as  Bishop of Como (1435–1437) and Bishop of Tortona (1437–1460).

Biography
On 13 June 1435, Giovanni Barbavara, the son of Giacomo Barbavara, was appointed during the papacy of Pope Eugene IV as Bishop of Como.
On 6 March 1437, he was appointed during the papacy of Pope Eugene IV as Bishop of Tortona.
He served as Bishop of Tortona until his death in 1460.

References

External links and additional sources
 (for Chronology of Bishops) 
 (for Chronology of Bishops) 
 (for Chronology of Bishops) 
 (for Chronology of Bishops) 

15th-century Italian Roman Catholic bishops
Bishops appointed by Pope Eugene IV
1460 deaths
San Nazzaro Sesia